The following table compares general and technical features of Nikon 1 series cameras.

Key:
Only effective megapixels are noted
Weight of camera is body only
Dimensions are expressed in the form of width × height × depth and have been rounded up
All cameras in the following table use the Nikon 1-mount

See also
Nikon 1-mount

Lists of photography topics
Nikon 1 camera comparison